Maun Airport  is an international airport serving the town of Maun in the North-West District of Botswana. It is on the north side of the town and is accessible by shuttle bus or taxi.

Maun Airport serves as the main gateway to the Okavango Delta and the Moremi Game Reserve. Many tour operators offer chartered flights over the Delta and to Botswana destinations such as the Makgadikgadi Pans, one of the largest seasonal wetlands in Africa. There are also daily scheduled flights to destinations in Botswana and South Africa.

Wilderness Air operates regular charter flights from its Windhoek-Eros-hub, Namibia to Maun.

Early history 1925-1939
The aircraft were awaited as they brought news of the outside world, mail, medicines, foodstuffs, and above all, new people to a community hundreds of kilometres from the nearest big town. The first air service began in the 1930s, using a landing strip that today is Maun's main street. The strip was later moved away from the town centre to the present site of the airport.

The earliest known flights over the Okavango took place in July 1925, and were part of a survey of rivers in the region, using aircraft based in Livingstone. Two Airco D.H. 9 type, numbers 142 and 144 of the then Union Defense Force of South Africa, were used, piloted by Captain C.W. Meredith and Lieutenant L. Tasker. They routed to Livingstone from Johannesburg via Bulawayo.

Airlink commenced direct flights between Cape Town and Maun starting in March 2016. In October 2016, Air Namibia suspended scheduled flights to Maun Airport. In May 2018 government officials confirmed their commitment to refurbish and upgrade the existing airport building.

Airlines and destinations

Accidents
In March 2000 a Cessna 414 crashed on its way from Gaborone to Maun.

See also
Transport in Botswana
List of airports in Botswana

References

External links
 Air Botswana (2009) Official Flight Schedule
 C. Michael Hogan (2008) Makgadikgadi, The Megalithic Portal, ed. A. Burnham 
 Maun Airport (MUB/FBMN) (2008), AZWorldAirports.com 
 Air Namibia axes Windhoek to Maun route
 Maun in Helipaddy

Airports in Botswana
North-West District (Botswana)